Polycystin-2 is a protein that in humans is encoded by the PKD2 gene.

This gene encodes a member of the polycystin protein family, called TRPP2, previously known as polycystin-2, PC2 or APKD2. TRPP2 contains multiple transmembrane domains, and cytoplasmic N- and C-termini. The protein may be an integral membrane protein involved in cell-cell/matrix interactions. TRPP2 may function in renal tubular development, morphology, and function, and may modulate intracellular calcium homeostasis and other signal transduction pathways. This protein interacts with polycystin 1 (TRPP1) to produce cation-permeable currents. It was discovered by Stefan Somlo at Yale University.

Clinical significance
Mutations in this gene have been associated with autosomal dominant polycystic kidney disease.

Interactions 

Polycystin 2 has been shown to interact with the proteins TRPC1, PKD1 and TNNI3.

See also 
 HAX1
 TRPP

References

Further reading

External links 
  GeneReviews/NIH/NCBI/UW entry on Polycystic Kidney Disease, Autosomal Dominant

EF-hand-containing proteins